Slonta or Suluntah is a town in the District of Jabal al Akhdar about  south of the city of Bayda. It is noted for its ruins of a pre-Greek temple for the berber north african people, that used to be in a cave which has since collapsed.

References

External links
"Slonta" at Livius:Articles on Ancient History
"Slonta Map — Satellite Images of Slonta" Maplandia World Gazetteer

Populated places in Jabal al Akhdar